Natalya Kovtun (born 27 May 1964) is a sprint athlete who represented the Soviet Union and later Russia. She specialized in the short sprints and also ran relay races, winning the silver medal in 4 × 100 metres relay at the 1991 World Championships in Athletics.

International competitions

External links 

1964 births
Living people
Russian female sprinters
Soviet female sprinters
World Athletics Championships athletes for the Soviet Union
World Athletics Championships medalists
Goodwill Games medalists in athletics
World Athletics Indoor Championships medalists
Competitors at the 1990 Goodwill Games